State Route 251 (SR 251) is a west–east secondary state highway in Middle Tennessee.

Route description

SR 251 begins in rural Cheatham County at an intersection with SR 249 (Sams Creek Road/River Road) south of Ashland City. It winds its way southeast along the banks of the Cumberland River as River Road to cross into Davidson County. It continues southeast as River Road Pike as it enters Nashville and has an intersection with US 70/SR 24 (Charlotte Pike), where SR 251 becomes part of Old Hickory Boulevard. It then continues south to have an interchange with I-40 (Exit 199) before entering Bellevue, where it comes to an end at an intersection with US 70S/SR 1 and Old Hickory Boulevard continues southward.

Major intersections

See also 
List of state routes in Tennessee

References 

251
Transportation in Cheatham County, Tennessee
Transportation in Davidson County, Tennessee
Transportation in Nashville, Tennessee